Sino-British Joint Declaration
Sino-Portuguese Joint Declaration
 Joint Declaration on the Doctrine of Justification
Joint Declaration by Members of the United Nations, in 1942 by the American and British governments on behalf of the Allied Powers, relating to the Holocaust
June 15th North–South Joint Declaration 
Joint Declaration: Challenges to Freedom of Expression in the next decade